Dan or Daniel Hunt may refer to

 Dan Hunt, Australian rugby league player for the St. George Illawarra Dragons
 Dan Hunt (American football), head football coach at Colgate University
 Daniel Hunt, English musician, songwriter, and producer
 Daniel J. Hunt, American politician in Massachusetts